The 2017 Taiwan Open was a women's tennis tournament played on indoor hard courts. It was the second edition of the event and part of the WTA International tournaments of the 2017 WTA Tour. The tournament was moved from Kaohsiung to Taipei starting from this year.

Points and prize money

Point distribution

Prize money

1 Qualifiers' prize money is also the Round of 32 prize money
* per team

Singles main-draw entrants

Seeds

1 Rankings as of January 16, 2017.

Other entrants
The following players received wildcards into the singles main draw:
  Lee Ya-hsuan
  Lucie Šafářová 
  Samantha Stosur

The following players received entry using a protected ranking:
  Galina Voskoboeva

The following players received entry from the qualifying draw:
  Marina Erakovic
  Lucie Hradecká
  Ons Jabeur
  Dalila Jakupović
  Miyu Kato
  Aleksandra Krunić

Withdrawals 
Before the tournament
  Catherine Bellis → replaced by  Risa Ozaki
  Kristína Kučová → replaced by  Mandy Minella
  Sabine Lisicki → replaced by  Jana Čepelová
  Christina McHale → replaced by  Magda Linette
  Pauline Parmentier → replaced by  Francesca Schiavone
  Alison Riske → replaced by  Nao Hibino

Retirements
  Sorana Cîrstea (Left wrist injury)

Doubles main-draw entrants

Seeds

1 Rankings as of January 16, 2017.

Other entrants 
The following pairs received wildcards into the doubles main draw:
  Hsieh Shu-ying /  Hsu Ching-wen
  Lee Ya-hsuan /  Peangtarn Plipuech

Champions

Singles

  Elina Svitolina def.  Peng Shuai 6–3, 6–2

Doubles

  Chan Hao-ching /  Chan Yung-jan def.  Lucie Hradecká /  Kateřina Siniaková, 6–4, 6–2

References
General
Official website
Specific

Taiwan Open
WTA Taiwan Open
2017 in Taiwanese tennis